Bedford Corn Exchange is an events and concert venue located on St Paul's Square in the Castle area of Bedford, Bedfordshire, England.

History of the Corn Exchange
The building (constructed in 1874) was designed to be a concert venue and meeting space, as well as a place of business. The basement contained offices, cloakrooms, kitchen, hall keepers room, and dining rooms. The build took two years and the total cost was £9,000. It replaced the "Floral Hall" building across St Paul's Square which had been constructed in 1849.

The BBC Symphony Orchestra used the Corn Exchange between September 1941 and July 1945 for public concerts which were broadcast to the nation. The BBC Music and Religious Departments moved to Bedford when it became too dangerous for them to be based in London or their wartime home, Bristol. Around 400 musicians, staff, and engineers moved to the town during World War Two.

In 1944, the BBC Proms came to Bedford. Since their birth, they had been performed in The Queen's Hall in London, which was destroyed by bombs on 10 May 1941. They moved to the Royal Albert Hall until that too became in danger and they transferred to the Corn Exchange for the rest of the 1944 season. The Corn Exchange played host to many star names during World War Two, including Glenn Miller, Bing Crosby, Marlene Dietrich, Vera Lynn, Bob Hope, Humphrey Bogart, Gracie Fields, David Niven, and Yehudi Menuhin. During this time, the Corn Exchange was also used as an Armed Forces Canteen.

In 1995, the Philharmonia Orchestra began a residency at the Corn Exchange. It is still one of the homes of the orchestra today.

Today
The Bedford Corn Exchange is a multi-purpose venue holding over 800 events per year. These include concerts, comedians, singers, council meetings, and corporate events. Performers at the venue for the Spring 2013 season include Marcus Brigstocke, Joe Calzaghe, Chas & Dave, The Drifters, Hawkwind, Lee Hurst, Jimeoin, Milton Jones, Russell Kane, Sean Lock, Showaddywaddy, and the Philharmonia Orchestra.

See also
 Corn Exchanges in England
 Bedford Civic Theatre
 University of Bedfordshire Theatre

References

External links
 Bedford Corn Exchange
Philharmonia Orchestra
Bedford Festival Fringe

Buildings and structures in Bedford
Tourist attractions in Bedfordshire
Culture in Bedfordshire
Music venues in Bedfordshire
Concert halls in England
Commercial buildings completed in 1874
Music venues completed in 1874
1874 establishments in England